What Chaos is Imaginary is the third studio album by American duo Girlpool. It was released on February 1, 2019 through Anti- Records.

Release and promotion
On October 9, 2018, Girlpool released the double single "Lucy's" and "Where You Sink", their first release to feature Tucker singing much deeper than he did previously due to taking testosterone. On November 13, the band released the single "Hire", and announced What Chaos Is Imaginary. Girlpool toured the United States in April and May 2019 to promote the album.

Critical Reception

What Chaos Is Imaginary received a weighted score of 74 out of 100 from review aggregate website Metacritic, indicating "generally favorable reviews", based on 19 reviews from music critics. Sasha Geffen of Pitchfork said about the album, "Weaving in and out of concrete, direct, indie-rock songwriting and meditative, impressionistic dream pop, the record takes up more space than any of Girlpool’s previous music."

Track listing

Charts

References

2019 albums
Anti- (record label) albums
Girlpool albums